Manuela Bezzola (born 12 August 1989) is a Swiss taekwondo practitioner. She defeated Chinese Taipei's Yang Shu-Chun for the gold medal in the  women's 51 kg division at the 2009 Summer Universiade in Belgrade, Serbia. She also captured a bronze medal in the bantamweight division (53 kg) at the 2010 European Taekwondo Championships in St. Petersburg, Russia.

Bezzola qualified for the women's 49 kg class at the 2008 Summer Olympics in Beijing, after placing second from the European Qualification Tournament in Istanbul, Turkey. She lost the preliminary round of sixteen match to Charlotte Craig of the United States, who was able to score four points at the end of the game.

References

External links

NBC 2008 Olympics profile

Swiss female taekwondo practitioners
1989 births
Living people
Olympic taekwondo practitioners of Switzerland
Taekwondo practitioners at the 2008 Summer Olympics
Taekwondo practitioners at the 2015 European Games
European Games competitors for Switzerland
Universiade medalists in taekwondo
Universiade gold medalists for Switzerland
European Taekwondo Championships medalists
Medalists at the 2009 Summer Universiade
21st-century Swiss women